Ylä-Enonvesi is a medium-sized lake in the Vuoksi main catchment area. It is located in the Southern Savonia region in Finland. The lake is important area of fishing industry.

See also
List of lakes in Finland

References

Lakes of Enonkoski